Lisa Taylor may refer to:

Lisa Taylor (R&B singer), 1990s American singer
Lisa Taylor (model), model and actress from New York City
Lisa Taylor (museum director), American artist and museum director
Lisa Taylor (alleged murderer), of the Taylor sisters convicted and then acquitted of murdering Alison Shaughnessy.